The 2021 Carlow Senior Football Championship was the 121st edition of the Carlow GAA's premier club Gaelic football tournament for senior graded clubs in County Carlow, Ireland. The tournament consisted of eight teams, with the winner going on to represent Carlow in the Leinster Senior Club Football Championship. The championship began with a group stage and then progressed to a knock-out stage.

Éire Óg were the defending champions after they defeated Rathvilly in the previous year's final.

This was Ballinabranna's return to the senior grade after claiming the 2020 Carlow Intermediate Football Championship title, thus ending a two-year exodus since being relegated in 2018. O'Hanrahans were relegated to the 2022 Carlow Intermediate Football Championship.

Team changes
The following teams have changed division since the 2020 championship season.

To S.F.C.
Promoted from 2020 Carlow Intermediate Football Championship
 Ballinabranna -  (Intermediate Champions)

From S.F.C.
Relegated to 2022 Carlow Intermediate Football Championship

 O'Hanrahans
 There was 9 senior teams in 2021 because no team was relegated in 2020 due to the impact of the COVID-19 pandemic on Gaelic games.

Group stage
There was one group of four teams and one group of five teams in 2021. The top two teams in each group competed in the semi-finals. The bottom team in each group competed in the relegation Final.

Group A

Round 1
 Bagenalstown Gaels 0-5, 0-4 Mount Leinster Rangers, 3/10/2021.
 Rathvilly 1-17, 1-5 Old Leighlin, 3/10/2021.

Round 2
 Rathvilly 2-10, 0-7 Ballinabranna , 10/10/2021.
 Bagenalstown Gaels 1-8, 0-9 Old Leighlin, 10/10/2021.

Round 3
 Rathvilly 1-8, 1-6 Mount Leinster Rangers, 30/09/2021.
 Bagenalstown Gaels 3-14, 2-11 Ballinabranna, 16/10/2021.

Round 4
 Rathvilly 0-13, 1-8 Bagenalstown Gaels, 23/10/2021.
 Old Leighlin 2-12, 1-13 Ballinabranna, 29/09/2021.

Round 5
 Mount Leinster Rangers 2-12, 2-10 Ballinabranna, 24/10/2021.
 Mount Leinster Rangers 1-10, 1-9 Old Leighlin, 3/10/2021.

Group B

Round 1
 Eire Og 3-14, 1-08 Palatine, 3/10/2021. 
 Tinryland 1-12, 1-4 O'Hanrahan's, 3/10/2021.

Round 2
 Eire Og 6-13, 0-8 O'Hanrahan's, 10/10/2021.
 Palatine 1-11, 0-9 Tinryland,  10/10/2021.

Round 3
 Eire Og 2-17, 0-7 Tinryland, 17/10/2021.
 Palatine 2-16, 0-9 O'Hanrahan's, 17/10/2021.

Knock-out stages

Finals
The winners and runners up of each group qualify for the quarter finals.

Quarter-finals
Bagenalstown Gaels and Mt. Leinster Rangers advanced to the 2021 semi finals.

Semi-finals
Rathvilly and Eire Og advanced to the 2021 final.

Final
Rathvilly won a first title since 2014 and prevented finalist Éire Óg from winning five consecutive titles.

Relegation play-off

Leinster Senior Club Football Championship
There was no Leinster Club Championship in 2021 due to the impact of the COVID-19 pandemic on Gaelic games.

References

 
 

Carlow SFC
Carlow Senior Football Championship
Carlow Senior Football Championship
Carlow Championship